Tindivanam flyover is states Second Railways Flyover. It has roundana  and four lanes. The flyover is located in heart of  the Tindivanam, between NH 66 (Bangalore - Pondicherry) and NH 45 (Chennai - Dindukkal).

This flyover was inaugurated by Tamil Nadu Chief Minister Mr. M. Karunanithi in the year 2000.  This flyover was constructed at a cost of Rs.22 Crores.

This Iconic flyover was Sanction and built with serious efforts of Tindivanam G. Venkataraman who was the Union minister for surface transport during 1996-97 and he was elected from Tindivanam parliamentary constituency to ease the traffic congestion due to Railway gate .

Bridges in Tamil Nadu